Marko Tepavac was the defending champion but chose not to defend his title.

Egor Gerasimov won the title after defeating Cem İlkel 6–3, 7–6(7–4) in the final.

Seeds

Draw

Finals

Top half

Bottom half

References
Main Draw
Qualifying Draw

2017 ATP Challenger Tour
2017 Singles